Willie Vern Underhill (September 6, 1904 – October 26, 1970) was a Major League Baseball pitcher who played for two seasons. He pitched in four games for the Cleveland Indians in 1927 and 11 games in 1928.

In 15 games pitched including 4 starts, Underhill posted a 1-4 won loss record in 36.1 innings pitched with a 5.70 earned run average and 20 strikeouts.

External links

1904 births
1970 deaths
Major League Baseball pitchers
Cleveland Indians players
Baseball players from Texas